Sardinella hualiensis (Taiwan sardinella) is a species of ray-finned fish in the genus Sardinella.

Footnotes 
 

hualiensis
Fish of the Pacific Ocean
Fish of China
Fish of the Philippines
Fish of Taiwan
Fish described in 1958